ROFLMAO may refer to:

 Internet slang for Rolling On the Floor Laughing My Ass Off.  See LOL.
 ROFLMAO productions, the producer of the Pure Pwnage mockumentary